Club Sportivo Desamparados is a sports club from the city of San Juan, and also called Consultants Moravia San Juan Province, Argentina. The football team currently plays in the Torneo Argentino B, which is one of the fourth tier competitions, along with the Primera C, of the Argentine league system.

History
Desamparados was founded in 1919 by a group of students from the Quinta Agronómica (Agricultural College), which is now the Escuela de Enología (Winemaking School). They chose the name "Desamparados" because they used to meet in Plaza Desamparados ("Desamparados Square"), and the name also paid tribute to the Virgen de los Desamparados (Virgin of the Unprotected in Spanish).

Desamparados has qualified to play at the top level of Argentine football 4 times, having reached the following positions:
1969: 12th (of 17 teams).
1972: 9th (of 13, Group B).
1973: 11th (of 15, Group B).
1974: 6th (of 9, Group A).

In 2004, Desamparados was promoted to the Torneo Argentino A (regionalized third division). They played in the category for 7 years, up to the 2010–11 season, when they reached promotion to the Primera B Nacional. During that season, the team finished third in their zone, earning the last spot for the second stage. In the second stage, they finished 7th (of 9 teams), but they defeated all their rivals in the direct elimination stages, earning a spot in the promotion playoff against San Martín de Tucumán. With a 2–1 overall victory over San Martín, Desamparados was effectively promoted to the second division.

Current Squad 2014/15

Titles
Torneo Argentino B: 1
Temporada 2004
Torneo Argentino A: 1
Apertura 2006

See also
List of football clubs in Argentina
Argentine football league system

External links
Official site 

Football clubs in San Juan Province, Argentina
Association football clubs established in 1919
Sportivo Desamparados